The Orlando Pops Orchestra is an American orchestra based in Orlando, Florida that specializes in playing classical and film score music.

Discography
 The Music The Magic Andrew Lloyd Webber (1996)
  Andrew Llody Webber -- Evita (1996)
  That's Entertainment, Vol. 2 (1996)
 Fright Night (1996)
  A. L. Webber Gold (1996)
 The Best Of John Williams (1996)
 American Thunder: The Power And The Glory (1996)
 Jesus Christ Superstar Nightlights (1996)
 The Magic of Andrew Lloyd Webber (1997)
 The Orlando Pops Orchestra Sampler (1997)
 A Night At The Movies (1997)
 God Bless America: A Salute To America's Great Composers (1997)
 John Williams: The Dream Goes On (1997)
 Hooray! For Hollywood (1998)
 The Magic Of John Williams (1998)
 Horror Classics (1998)
 Cine de Terror (1998)
 A Salute To George Gershwin (1998)
 Kids' TV

External links

1993 establishments in Florida
Madacy Entertainment artists
Music of Orlando, Florida
Musical groups established in 1993
Orchestras based in Florida
Organizations based in Orlando, Florida
Pops orchestras
Sound-alike musical groups